Sana Althaf is an Indian actress who works in Malayalam and Tamil films.

Career
She was born in Kochi, Kerala to Althaf and Shameena Althaf. She attended Bhavan's Adarsha Vidyalaya in Kochi. She was a TV host before starting an acting career. She made her movie debut playing Dulquer Salman's sister in Vikramadithyan. She got the role through her aunt Sajna Najam. She then played the female lead, Salomi in Mariyam Mukku, opposite Fahadh Faazil and was also seen as a trekker in Rani Padmini. She made her Tamil debut through Chennai 600028 II: Second Innings playing Anuradha. She then acted alongside Farhan Faazil in Basheerinte Premalekhanam as Suhra. She was then seen in Odiyan were she played Meenakshi, sister of Manju Warrier. She was then seen in Tamil movies RK Nagar and Pancharaksharam.

Filmography

References

External links
 
 

Living people
Indian film actresses
Actresses in Malayalam cinema
Actresses from Kochi
Actresses in Tamil cinema
21st-century Indian actresses
Year of birth missing (living people)